St. Columba's School may refer to:

Australia
St. Columba's Primary School, Wilston, Queensland

India
St. Columba's School, Delhi

Malaysia
SMK St. Columba, Miri
SK St Columba, Miri

United Kingdom
St Columba's Catholic Boys' School, London, England
St Columba's School, Kilmacolm, Renfrewshire, Scotland

United States
St. Columba's School (Schenectady, New York), listed on the National Register of Historic Places

See also
St Columba's College (disambiguation)